Putao District is the northernmost of district of Myanmar and part of the Kachin State in northern Burma bordering China. The capital lies at Putao.

Townships
The district is divided into five administrative townships:

Putao Township 
Sumprabum Township
Machanbaw Township 
Kawnglanghpu Township 
Nogmung Township

Districts of Myanmar
Kachin State

Transportation
The main link to Putao district is the Putao Airport located in the main town of Putao.

Tourism
The district's Hkakabo Razi, which is the highest peak of Myanmar is located in the northern border with China. The peak is the southern end of the Himalayas mountain range. The peak which has snows all year round is a favorite among Burmese climbers and international visitors looking to climb up in the country.